Manampoka is a monotypic genus of Malagasy araneomorph spiders in the family Phyxelididae containing the single species, Manampoka atsimo. It was first described by C. E. Griswold, H. M. Wood & A. D. Carmichael in 2012, and is only found on Madagascar.

See also
 List of Phyxelididae species

References

Monotypic Araneomorphae genera
Phyxelididae
Spiders of Madagascar